Fabiano Joseph Naasi (born December 24, 1985, in Babati, Manyara) is a Tanzanian long-distance runner.

International competitions

Road running competitions
2006 Bogota Half Marathon – 1st

References

External links
 
 
 

1985 births
Living people
People from Manyara Region
Tanzanian male long-distance runners
Tanzanian male marathon runners
Olympic athletes of Tanzania
Athletes (track and field) at the 2004 Summer Olympics
Athletes (track and field) at the 2008 Summer Olympics
Commonwealth Games bronze medallists for Tanzania
Commonwealth Games medallists in athletics
Athletes (track and field) at the 2006 Commonwealth Games
Athletes (track and field) at the 2014 Commonwealth Games
World Athletics Championships athletes for Tanzania
World Athletics Half Marathon Championships winners
Medallists at the 2006 Commonwealth Games